Conjurer's Neck Archeological District is a set of two historic archaeological sites and national historic district located at Colonial Heights, Virginia. The district includes the previously listed Conjurer's Field Archeological Site prehistoric village site (44CF20) and the site of a Colonial-period plantation house, known as the Kennon House or Old Brick House (44CF646). The original house was built between 1725 and 1750, and rebuilt in 1879 after a fire.  The site possesses undisturbed and stratified cultural features dating to the late 1700s and afterward.

It was listed on the National Register of Historic Places in 2003.

References

Archaeological sites on the National Register of Historic Places in Virginia
Houses on the National Register of Historic Places in Virginia
Historic districts on the National Register of Historic Places in Virginia
Houses completed in 1879
Buildings and structures in Colonial Heights, Virginia
National Register of Historic Places in Colonial Heights, Virginia